Peace Be Still is the debut studio album by American contemporary Christian singer Hope Darst. The album was released on August 21, 2020, by Fair Trade Services and Columbia Records. The album was produced by Jonathan Smith and Max Corwin.

The album has been supported by the release of "Peace Be Still" and "Promise Keeper" as singles. "Peace Be Still" peaked at No. 2 on the Hot Christian Songs chart. "Promise Keeper" peaked at No. 26 on the Hot Christian Songs chart. "Set Free" was released as a promotional single. The album debuted at number 23 on Billboards Top Christian Albums Chart in the United States.

Release and promotion

Singles
Hope Darst released "Peace Be Still" as the lead single to the album on February 7, 2020. "Peace Be Still" peaked at number six on the US Hot Christian Songs chart. "Peace Be Still" received a nomination for the GMA Dove Award Worship Recorded Song of the Year at the 2021 GMA Dove Awards.

"Promise Keeper" was released to Christian radio in the United States on December 26, 2020, as the second single from the album. "Promise Keeper" peaked at No. 26 on the US Hot Christian Songs chart. "Promise Keeper" received a nomination for the GMA Dove Award Inspirational Recorded Song of the Year at the 2021 GMA Dove Awards.

Promotional singles
Hope Darst initially released "Promise Keeper" and "Set Free" as the two promotional singles in the lead-up to the release of the album on July 10, 2020, launching the album's digital pre-order.

Critical reception

Joshua Andre in his 365 Days of Inspiring Media review, said: "I'm of the opinion that though some lyrics are cliché overall, the heart for Jesus and the passion behind the album still ring true. Peace Be Still may not be my favourite album of the year, but it is an album that will bless and inspire you," Jesus Freak Hideout's Joel Zaloum wrote a negative review of the album, saying: "There's no doubt Hope Darst has the potential to make it big in the Christian music scene, and she's obviously well on her way to doing so. But for this reviewer, her popularity says a lot more about the current state of popular Christian music then anything else. While I cannot deny her obvious enthusiasm and heart for the Lord, as an album, Peace Be Still is a miss." "Hope’s powerful and gorgeous vocals keep me hanging on every word she sings. She invites listeners into her life by sharing what's on her heart. The standout songs each feature an engaging and emotive musical style while phrasing her prayer-filled songs in a creative and personal way, making it one of my top worship albums of the year."

Commercial performance
In the United States, Peace Be Still debuted at number 23 on the Billboard Top Christian Albums chart dated September 5, 2020.

Track listing

Personnel
Credits adapted from AllMusic.

 Jacob Arnold — drums, percussion
 Jess Barrios — make-up
 Max Corwin — bass, editing, engineer, keyboards, producer, programming
 Dave Curran — bass
 Hope Darst — primary artist, background vocals
 Austin Davis — drums, percussion, programming
 Connor Dwyer — design
 Rachel Dwyer — design
 Taylor Johnson — acoustic guitar, electric guitar
 Elizabeth Lamb — viola
 Jeremy Larson — cello, string arrangements, strings, viola, violin
 Tim Lauer — keyboards, programmer, programming
 Joe LePorta — cello, mastering, string arrangements, viola, violin
 Robert Marvin — programming
 Brenton Miles — engineer
 Sean Moffitt — engineer, mixing
 David Ramirez — programming
 James Rueger — A&R
 Jonathan Smith — acoustic guitar,  background vocals, bass, electric guitar, keyboards, organ, piano, producer, programming
 Jacob Sooter — piano
 Matt Stanfield — keyboards, piano, programming, synthesizer

Charts

Weekly charts

Year-end charts

Release history

References

External links
  on PraiseCharts

2020 albums